Kark-e Olya (also Romanized as Kark-e ‘Olyā and Karak Olya; also known as Kark-e Bālā and Karak-e Bālā) is a village in Giyan Rural District, Giyan District, Nahavand County, Hamadan Province, Iran. At the 2006 census, its population was 795, in 203 families.

References 

Populated places in Nahavand County